Harry Elmore Hurd (April 23, 1889August 21, 1958) was an American poet and minister.

Life 
Harry Hurd was born on April 23, 1889, in New Hampshire. He graduated from Boston University in 1916 and Harvard University in 1922.  He was a Chaplain, First Lieutenant with the 33rd Engineers during World War I.  He was a minister in Methodist and Congregational churches for eighteen years, in Haverhill, Quincy, and Reading.

Hurd died on August 21, 1958, in Haverhill, Massachusetts.

Publications 
His work was publisher in Prairie Schooner, Overland Monthly, Voices, Saturday Review,

Awards 
 Golden Rose Award

Works

Books

Anthologies

References

1889 births
1958 deaths
Harvard University alumni
Boston University alumni
World War I chaplains
People from Haverhill, Massachusetts
American World War I poets
20th-century American male writers
American male poets
United States Army chaplains
United States Army personnel of World War I
United States Army officers
20th-century American clergy
Military personnel from Massachusetts